Leaching is  a process widely used in extractive metallurgy where ore is treated with chemicals to convert the valuable metals within into soluble salts while the impurity remains insoluble. These can then be washed out and processed to give the pure metal; the materials left over are commonly known as tailings. Compared to pyrometallurgy, leaching is easier to perform, requires less energy and is potentially less harmful as no gaseous pollution occurs. Drawbacks of leaching include its lower efficiency and the often significant quantities of waste effluent and tailings produced, which are usually either highly acidic or alkali as well as toxic (e.g. bauxite tailings). 

There are four types of leaching: 

 Cyanide leaching (e.g. gold ore)
 Ammonia leaching (e.g. crushed ore)  
 Alkali leaching (e.g. bauxite ore)  
 Acid leaching (e.g. sulfide ore)

Chemistry 
Leaching is done in long pressure vessels which are cylindrical (horizontal or vertical) or of horizontal tube form known as autoclaves. A good example of the autoclave leach process can also be found in the metallurgy of zinc. It is best described by the following chemical reaction:

This reaction proceeds at temperatures above the boiling point of water, thus creating a vapour pressure inside the vessel. Oxygen is injected under pressure, making the total pressure in the autoclave more than 0.6 MPa and temperature at 473-523 K .

The leaching of precious metals such as gold can be carried out with cyanide or ozone under mild conditions.

See also
 Heap leaching
 In-situ leaching
 Tank leaching

References

Metallurgical processes